Placoptila cyanolychna is a moth in the family Cosmopterigidae. It is found on Borneo.

References

Natural History Museum Lepidoptera generic names catalog

Cosmopteriginae